The United States Army uses various personnel management systems to classify soldiers in different specialties which they receive specialized and formal training on once they have successfully completed Basic Combat Training (BCT).

Enlisted soldiers are categorized by their assigned job called a Military Occupational Specialty (MOS). MOS are labeled with a short alphanumerical code called a military occupational core specialty code (MOSC), which consists of a two-digit number appended by a Latin letter. Related MOSs are grouped together by Career Management Fields (CMF). For example, an enlisted soldier with MOSC 11B works as an infantryman (his MOS), and is part of CMF 11 (the CMF for infantry).

Commissioned officers are classified by their area of concentration, or AOC. Just like enlisted MOSCs, AOCs are two digits plus a letter. Related AOCs are grouped together by specific branch of the Army or by broader in scope functional areas (FA). Typically, an officer will start in an AOC of a specific branch and move up to an FA AOC.

Warrant officers are classified by warrant officer military occupational specialty, or WOMOS. Codes consists of three digits plus a letter. Related WOMOS are grouped together by Army branch.

The Army is currently restructuring its personnel management systems, as of 2019. Changes took place in 2004 and continued into 2013. Changes include deleting obsolete jobs, merging redundant jobs, and using common numbers for both enlisted CMFs and officer AOCs (e.g. "35" is military intelligence for both officers and enlisted).

Immaterial & Personnel Special Reporting Codes
Officer
00A Duties Unassigned
00B General Officer
00C Relieved from Duty; Sick in Hospital or Quarters
00D Newly Commissioned Officers Awaiting Entry on Active Duty for Officer Basic Course Attendance
00E Student Officer
01A Officer Generalist
01B Aviation/Infantry/Armor/MI Immaterial
01C Chemical/Engineer/MP Immaterial
01D Army Financial Management/Adjutant General immaterial
02A Combat Arms Generalist
02B Infantry/Armor Immaterial
02C Infantry/Armor/Field Artillery/Engineer Immaterial
03A Infantry/Armor Immaterial
05A Army Medical Department
09G Army National Guard (ARNG) on Active Duty Medical Hold
09H US Army Reserve (USAR) on Active Duty Medical Hold

Warrant
001A Unqual in Auth WO MOS
002A Patient
003A Student
004A Duties Unassigned
011A Brch/MOS Immaterial
019G Army National Guard on Active Duty Medical Hold
019H US Army Reserve on Active Duty Medical Hold

Enlisted
00F MOS Immaterial National Guard Bureau (NGB)
00G MOS Immaterial US Army Reserve (USAR)
00S Special Duty Assignment AFSC
00Z Command Sergeant Major
09B Trainee Unassigned
09C Trainee Language
09D College Trainee
09G Army National Guard (ARNG) on Active Duty Medical Hold
09H US Army Reserve (USAR) on Active Duty Medical Hold
09J GED Completion Program
09M March 2 Success
09N Nurse Corps Candidate
09R Simultaneous MBR Program
09S Commissioned Officer Candidate
09T College Student Army National Guard Officer Program
09U Prior Service or Branch Transfer without Defined MOS
09W Warrant Officer Candidate

Infantry Branch (IN)

Officer
11A Infantry Officer
Enlisted
11B Infantryman (includes soldiers formerly designated 11M [Mechanized] and 11H [Anti-armor]) 11B Infantryman is the basic infantry soldier MOS of the US Army.
11C Indirect Fire Infantryman (Mortarman)
11D Armor Reconnaissance Specialist
11E Armor Crewmen
11H Heavy Anti-armor Weapons Crewman
11M Fighting Vehicle Infantryman
11X Undetermined Infantry (Open Enlistment Option, B/C determined during training.)
11Z Infantry Senior Sergeant

Corps of Engineers Branch (EN)

Prior to 1999, the Engineer designations were 12 series and 83 series.
In 1999, CMF 83 changed to CMF 51.
In 2004, CMF 51 changed to CMF 21.
In 2004, the engineer designation changed from 12 to 21.
In 2009, the engineer designation was changed again, from CMF 21 to CMF 12.
In 2013, the engineer officer designations 12B (Combat Engineer) and 12D (Facilities/Contract Construction Management Engineer (FCCME)) were consolidated into 12A.

Officer
12A Engineer; General Engineer

Warrant
120A Construction Engineer Technician
125D Geospatial Information Technician

Enlisted
12A Engineer Senior Sergeant
12B Combat Engineer 
12C Bridge Crewmember
12D Diver
12G Quarrying Specialist (RC)
12H Construction Engineering Supervisor
12K Plumber
12M Firefighter
12N Horizontal Construction Engineer
12P Prime Power Production Specialist
12Q Power Line Distribution Specialist (RC); No longer in use
12R Interior Electrician
12T Technical Engineer
12V Concrete and Asphalt Equipment Operator; No longer in use
12W Carpentry and Masonry Specialist
12X General Engineering Supervisor
12Y Geospatial Engineer
12Z Combat Engineering Senior Sergeant

Field Artillery Branch (FA)

Officer
13A Field Artillery Officer

Warrant
131A Field Artillery Technician

Enlisted
13B Cannon Crewmember
13F Fire Support Specialist
13J Fire Control Specialist (Formerly 13P and 13D)
13M Multiple Launch Rocket System/High Mobility Artillery Rocket System Crewmember
13R Field Artillery Firefinder Radar Operator
13Z Field Artillery Senior Sergeant/Sergeant Major

Air Defense Artillery Branch (ADA)

Officer
14A Air Defense Artillery Officer

Warrant
140A Command and Control Systems Integrator
140K Air And Missile Defense (AMD) Tactician
140L Air and Missile Defense (AMD) Technician (Patriot Systems Technician)
140Z Air Defense Artillery (ADA) Immaterial

Enlisted
14E PATRIOT Fire Control Enhanced Operator/Maintainer
14G Air Defense Battle Management System Operator
14H Air Defense Enhanced Early Warning System Operator
14P Air and Missile Defense Crewmember
14S Avenger Crew Member
14T PATRIOT Launching Station Enhanced Operator/Maintainer
14Z Air Defense Artillery (ADA) Senior Sergeant

Aviation Branch (AV)
Officer
15A Aviation Officer
15B Aviation Combined Arms Operations
15C Aviation All-Source Intelligence Officer
15D Aviation Maintenance Officer

Warrant
150A Air Traffic and Air Space Management Technician
150U Unmanned Aircraft Systems Operations Technician
151A Aviation Maintenance Technician (Nonrated)
152C OH-6 Pilot
152E AH-64E Attack Pilot
152F AH-64A Attack Pilot
152G AH-1 Attack Pilot (RC) 
152H AH-64D Attack Pilot
153A Rotary Wing Aviator (Aircraft Nonspecific)
153B UH-1 Pilot (RC)
153D UH-60 Pilot
153DD UH-60 MEDEVAC Pilot
153E MH-60 Pilot
153L UH-72A Pilot
153M UH-60M Pilot
154C CH-47D Pilot
154E MH-47 Pilot
154F CH-47F Pilot
155A Fixed Wing Aviator (Aircraft Nonspecific)
155E C-12 Pilot
155F Jet Aircraft Pilot (C-20F/J)
155G O-5A/EO-5B/RC-7 Pilot
Enlisted
15B Aircraft Powerplant Repairer
15C MQ-1 (Gray Eagle) Operator
15D Aircraft Powertrain Repairer
15E RQ-5 (Shadow) Repairer
15F Aircraft Electrician
15G Aircraft Structural Repairer
15H Aircraft Pneudraulics Repairer
15K Aircraft Components Repair Supervisor
15M MQ-1 (Gray Eagle) Repairer
15N Avionic Mechanic
15P Aviation Operations Specialist
15Q Air Traffic Control Operator
15R AH-64 Attack Helicopter Repairer
15T UH-60 Helicopter Repairer
15U CH-47 Helicopter Repairer
15V Observation/Scout Helicopter Repairer (RC)
15W RQ-5 (Shadow) Operator
15X AH-64A Armament/Electrical/Avionics Systems Repairer
15Y AH-64D Armament/Electrical/Avionic Systems Repairer
15Z Aircraft Maintenance Senior Sergeant

Cyber Branch (CY)

Officer
17A Cyber Warfare Officer
17B Cyber Electromagnetic Activities Officer - Electronic Warfare
17D Cyber Capabilities Development Officer
17X Cyber Officer Designated

Warrant
170A Cyber Operations Technician
170B Cyber Electromagnetic Activities Technician - Electronic Warfare
170D Cyber Capabilities Developer Technician

Enlisted
17C Cyber Operations Specialist
17E Electronic Warfare Specialist

Special Forces (SF)

Officer
18A Special Forces Officer - CPT-COL

Warrant
180A Special Forces Warrant Officer - WO1-CW5

Enlisted
18B Special Forces Weapons Sergeant - SGT-SFC
18C Special Forces Engineer Sergeant - SGT-SFC
18D Special Forces Medical Sergeant - SGT-SFC
18E Special Forces Communications Sergeant - SGT-SFC
18F Special Forces Intelligence Sergeant - SSG-SFC
18X Special Forces Candidate
18Z Special Forces Senior Sergeant - MSG-CSM

Armor Branch (AR)

Officer
19A Armor Officer

Enlisted
19C Bradley Crewmember
19D Cavalry Scout
19K M1 Armor Crewman
19Z Armor Senior Sergeant

Signal Corps Branch (SC)

Officer
25A Signal, General

Warrant
255A Information Services Technician
255N Network Management Technician
255S Information Protection Technician
255Z Senior Network Operations Technician

Enlisted
25B Information Technology Specialist
25D Cyber Network Defender
25E Electromagnetic Spectrum Manager
25H Network Communication Systems Specialist
25S Satellite Communications Systems Operator/Maintainer
25U Signal Support Systems Specialist
25W Telecommunications Operations Chief
25X Chief Signal NCO
25Z Visual Information Operations Chief

Information Network Engineering Functional Area (FA 26)
Effective 1 October 2016, Functional Areas 24 and 53 were merged into FA 26.

Officer
26A Network Systems Engineer (formerly Functional Area 24A, Telecommunications Systems Engineer)
26B Information Systems Engineer (formerly Functional Area 53A, Information Systems Manager)
26Z Senior Information Network Engineer (26A and 26B merge at O6 to 26Z)

Judge Advocate General Branch (JA)

Officer
27A Judge Advocate
27B Military Judge

Warrant
270A Legal Administrator

Enlisted
27D Paralegal Specialist

Information Operations Functional Area (FA 30)
Officer
30A Information Operations Officer

Military Police Branch (MP)

Officer
31A Military Police

Warrant
311A CID Special Agent

Enlisted
31B Military Police
31D CID Special Agent
31E Internment/Resettlement Specialist
31K Working Dog Handler

Strategic Intelligence Functional Area (FA 34)
Officer
34A Strategic Intelligence Officer

Military Intelligence Branch (MI)
Officer
35D All Source Intelligence Officer
35E Counterintelligence Officer
35F Human Intelligence Officer
35G Signals Intelligence Officer

Warrant
350F All Source Intelligence Technician
350G Imagery Intelligence Technician
351Z Attaché Technician
351L Counterintelligence Supervisory Special Agent
351M Human Intelligence Collection Technician
351Y Area Intelligence Technician
352N Signal Intelligence Analysis Technician
352S Signals Collector Technician
353T Intelligence Systems Maintenance Technician
Enlisted
09L Interpreter/Translator
35F Intelligence Analyst
35G Geospatial Intelligence Imagery Analyst
35L Counterintelligence Special Agent
35M Human Intelligence Collector
35N Signals Intelligence Analyst
35P Cryptologic Linguist
35Q Cryptologic Network Warfare Specialist; No longer in use
35S Signals Collector/Analyst
35T Military Intelligence Systems Maintainer/Integrator
35V Signals Intelligence Senior Sergeant/Chief Signals Intelligence Sergeant
35X Intelligence Senior Sergeant/Chief Intelligence Sergeant
35Y Chief Counterintelligence/Human Intelligence Sergeant
35Z Signals Intelligence (Electronic Warfare) / Senior Sergeant/ Chief

Finance & Comptroller Branch (FC)

Officer
36A Financial Manager
Enlisted
36B Financial Management Technician

Psychological Operations Branch (PO)

Officer
37A Psychological Operations

Enlisted
37F Psychological Operations Specialist

Civil Affairs Branch (CA)

Officer
38A Civil Affairs Officer
38G Military Government Specialist
38S Special Operations Civil Affairs Officer

Enlisted
38B Civil Affairs Specialist
38R Civil Reconnaissance Sergeant
38W Civil Affairs Medic
38Z Civil Affairs Senior Sergeant

Space Operations Functional Area (FA 40)
Officer
 40A Space Operations
40C Army Astronaut

Adjutant General Corps (AG)

Officer
42B Human Resources Officer
42C Army Bands
42H Senior Human Resources Officer

Warrant
420A Human Resources Technician
420C Bandmaster

Enlisted
42A Human Resources Specialist
42R Musician
42S Special Band Member

Recruiting
79R Recruiter Noncommissioned Officer
79S Career Counselor
79T Recruiting and Retention NCO (ANG)
79V Army Reserve Career Counselor (USAR)

Public Affairs Functional Area (FA and CMF 46)
Officer
46A Public Affairs, General
46X Public Affairs, General
Enlisted
46S Public Affairs Mass Communications Specialist
46Z Chief Public Affairs NCO

Academy Professor Functional Area (FA 47)

Officer
47A USMA, Professor
47C USMA, Professor of English
47D USMA, Professor of Electrical Engineering and Computer Science
47E USMA, Professor of Law
47F USMA, Professor of Systems Engineering
47G USMA, Professor of Foreign Languages
47H USMA, Professor of Physics
47J USMA, Professor of Social Sciences
47K USMA, Professor of History
47L USMA, Professor of Behavioral Sciences and Leadership
47M USMA, Professor of Chemistry
47N USMA, Professor of Mathematical Sciences
47P USMA, Professor of Geography and Environmental Engineering
47Q USMA, Professor and Associate Dean
47R USMA, Professor of Civil and Mechanical Engineering
47S USMA, Professor of Physical Education
47T USMA, Professor of Leader Development and Organizational Learning
47U USMA, Professor of Military Art and Science
47V USMA, Professor of Army Cyber

Foreign Area Officer Functional Area (FA 48)
Officer
48B Latin America
48C Europe (no longer used -- these officers are now designated 48E)
48D South Asia
48E Eurasia
48F China
48G Mideast/North Africa
48H Northeast Asia
48I Southeast Asia
48J Africa, South of the Sahara
48X Foreign Area Officer

Operations Research/Systems Analysis (ORSA) Functional Area (FA 49)
Officer
49A Operations Research/Systems Analysis
49W Trained, ORSA
49X Untrained, ORSA

Force Management Functional Area (FA 50)
Officer
50A Force Development

Army Acquisition Corps (FA and CMF 51)

Officer
51A Program Management
51C Contract Management
51R Systems Automation Acquisition and Engineering
51S Research and Engineering
51T Test and Evaluation
51Z Acquisitions

Noncommissioned Officer
51C Acquisition, Logistics & Technology (AL&T) Contracting NCO

Nuclear and Counter WMD Functional Area (FA 52)
Officer
52B Nuclear and Counter WMD Officer

Chaplain Branch (CH)
Officer
56A Command and Unit Chaplain
56D Clinical Pastoral Educator
56X Chaplain Candidate
Enlisted
56M Religious Affairs Specialist

Simulation Operations Functional Area (FA 57)
Officer
57A Simulation Operations Officer

Army Marketing Functional Area (FA 58)
Officer
58A Army Marketing Officer

Strategic Plans and Policy Functional Area (FA 59)
Officer
59A Strategist

Medical Department Branches

Medical Corps Branch (MC)
Officer
60A Operational Medicine
60B Nuclear Medicine Officer
60C Preventive Medicine Officer
60D Occupational Medicine Officer
60F Pulmonary Disease/Critical Care Officer
60G Gastroenterologist
60H Cardiologist
60J Obstetrician and Gynecologist
60K Urologist
60L Dermatologist
60M Allergist, Clinical Immunologist
60N Anesthesiologist
60P Pediatrician
60Q Pediatric Sub-Specialist
60R Child Neurologist
60S Ophthalmologist
60T Otolaryngologist
60U Child Psychiatrist
60V Neurologist
60W Psychiatrist
61A Nephrologist
61B Medical Oncologist/Hematologist
61C Endocrinologist
61D Rheumatologist
61E Clinical Pharmacologist
61F Internist
61G Infectious Disease Officer
61H Family Medicine
61J General Surgeon
61K Thoracic Surgeon
61L Plastic Surgeon
61M Orthopedic Surgeon
61N Flight Surgeon
61P Physiatrist
61Q Radiation Oncologist
61R Diagnostic Radiologist
61U Pathologist
61W Peripheral Vascular Surgeon
61Z Neurosurgeon
62A Emergency Physician
62B Field Surgeon

Dental Corps Branch (DC)
Officer
63A General Dentist
63B Comprehensive Dentist
63D Periodontist
63E Endodontist
63F Prosthodontist
63H Public Health Dentist
63K Pediatric Dentist
63M Orthodontist
63N Oral and Maxillofacial Surgeon
63P Oral Pathologist
63R Executive Dentist

Veterinary Corps Branch (VC)

Officer
64A Field Veterinary Service
64B Veterinary Preventive Medicine
64C Veterinary Laboratory Animal Medicine
64D Veterinary Pathology
64E Veterinary Comparative Medicine
64F Veterinary Clinical Medicine
64Z Senior Veterinarian (Immaterial)

Warrant
640A Food Safety Officer

Medical Specialist Corps Branch (SP)

Officer
65A Occupational Therapy
65B Physical Therapy
65C Dietitian
65D Physician Assistant
65X Specialist Allied Operations

Nurse Corps Branch (AN)

Officer
66B Public Health Nurse
66C Psychiatric/Mental Health Nurse
66E Perioperative Nurse
66F Nurse Anesthetist
66G Obstetrics and Gyneco
66H Medical-Surgical Nurse
66N Generalist Nurse
66P Family Nurse Practitioner
66R Psychiatric Nurse Practitioner
66S Critical Care Nurse
66T Emergency Room Nurse
66W Certified Nurse Midwife

Medical Service Corps Branch (MS)

Officer
67A Health Services
67B Laboratory Sciences
67C Preventive Medicine Sciences
67D Behavioral Sciences
67E Pharmacy
67F Optometry
67G Podiatry
67J Aeromedical Evacuation

Warrant
670A Health Services Maintenance Technician

Medical CMF
Enlisted
68A Biomedical Equipment Specialist
68B Orthopedic Specialist
68C Practical Nursing Specialist-(LPN/LVN)
68D Operating Room Specialist
68E Dental Specialist
68F Physical Therapy Specialist
68G Patient Administration Specialist (formerly 71G)
68H Optical Laboratory Specialist
68J Medical Logistics Specialist
68K Medical Laboratory Specialist
68L Occupational Therapy Specialist
68M Nutrition Care Specialist
68N Cardiovascular Specialist
68P Radiology Specialist
68Q Pharmacy Specialist
68R Veterinary Food Inspection Specialist
68S Preventive Medicine Specialist
68T Animal Care Specialist
68U Ear, Nose, and Throat (ENT) Specialist
68V Respiratory Specialist
68W Combat Medic Specialist
68X Behavioral Health Specialist
68Y Eye Specialist
68Z Chief Medical NCO

Health Services FA
Officer
70A Health Care Administration
70B Health Services Administration 
70C Health Services Comptroller 
70D Health Services Systems Management
70E Patient Administration 
70F Health Services Human Resources
70H Health Services Plans, Operations, Intelligence, Security, and Training 
70K Health Services Materiel
Laboratory Sciences FA
Officer
71A Microbiology
71B Biochemistry
71E Clinical Laboratory
71F Research Psychology
Preventive Medicine Sciences FA
Officer
72A Nuclear Medical Science
72B Entomology
72C Audiology
72D Environmental Science and Engineering
Behavioral Sciences FA
Officer
73A Social Work
73B Clinical Psychology

Chemical Corps (CM)

Officer
74A Chemical, General

Warrant
740A Chemical, Biological, Radiological and Nuclear (CBRN) Warrant Officer

Enlisted
74D Chemical, Biological, Radiological and Nuclear (CBRN) Specialist (formerly 54E)

Logistics Corps

As of 1 Jan 2008, all officers from Quartermaster, Transportation and Ordnance branches who have attended the Captain's Career Course, with the exception of EOD officers (89E), are transitioned to the Logistics branch.

Officer
90A Multifunctional Logistician (LG)

Transportation Branch (TC)

Officer
88A Transportation, General
88B Traffic Management
88C Marine and Terminal Operations
88D Motor/Rail Transportation

Warrant
880A Marine Deck Officer
881A Marine Engineering Officer
882A Mobility Officer

Enlisted
88H Cargo Specialist
88K Watercraft Operator
88L Watercraft Engineer
88M Motor Transport Operator
88N Transportation Management Coordinator
88P Railway Equipment Repairer (RC)
88T Railway Section Repairer (RC)
88U Railway Operations Crew Member (RC)
88Z Transportation Senior Sergeant

Ammunition CMF, Mechanical Maintenance CMF & Ordnance Branch (OD)

Officer
89E Explosive Ordnance Disposal Officer
91A Materiel Maintenance and Munitions Management Officer

Warrant
890A Ammunition Warrant Officer
913A Armament Systems Maintenance Warrant Officer
914A Allied Trades Warrant Officer
915A Automotive Maintenance Warrant Officer
915E Senior Automotive Maintenance Warrant Officer
919A Engineer Equipment Maintenance Warrant Officer
948B Electronic Systems Maintenance Warrant Officer
948D Electronic Missile Systems Maintenance Warrant Officer
948E Senior Electronics Maintenance Warrant Officer

Enlisted
89A Ammunition Stock Control and Accounting Specialist
89B Ammunition Specialist
89D Explosive Ordnance Disposal Specialist
91A M1 Abrams Tank System Maintainer (formerly 63A)
91B Wheeled Vehicle Mechanic (formerly 63B)
91C Utilities Equipment Repairer (formerly 52C)
91D Power Generation Equipment Repairer (formerly 52D)
91E Allied Trades Specialist (formerly 91E and 91W)
91F Small Arms/Towed Artillery Repairer (formerly 45B)
91G Fire Control Repairer (formerly 45G)
91H Track Vehicle Repairer (formerly 63H)
91J Quartermaster and Chemical Equipment Repairer (formerly 63J)
91L Construction Equipment Repairer (formerly 62B)
91M Bradley Fighting Vehicle System Maintainer (formerly 63T)
91P Self Propelled Artillery Systems Maintainer (formerly 63D)
91S Stryker Systems Maintainer
91X Maintenance Supervisor (formerly 63X)
91Z Senior Maintenance Supervisor (formerly 63Z)
94A Land Combat Electronic Missile System Repairer (formerly 27E)
94D Air Traffic Control Equipment Repairer
94E Radio & Communications Security (COMSEC) Equipment Repairer
94F Computer/Detection Systems Repairer
94H Test Measurement and Diagnostic Equipment (TMDE) Maintenance Support Specialist
94M Radar Repairer
94P Multiple Launch Rocket System (MLRS) Repairer (formerly 27M)
94R Avionic and Survivability Repairer
94S PATRIOT System Repairer
94T AVENGER System Repairer
94W Electronic Maintenance Chief
94X Senior Missile Systems Maintainer
94Y Integrated Family of Test Equipment (IFTE) Operator/Maintainer
94Z Senior Electronic Maintenance Chief

Quartermaster Corps Branch (QM)

Officer
92A Quartermaster Officer
92D Aerial Delivery and Materiel

Warrant
920A Property Accounting Technician
920B Supply Systems Technician
921A Airdrop Systems Technician
922A Food Service Technician
923A Petroleum Systems Technician

Enlisted
92A Automated Logistical Specialist
92F Petroleum Supply Specialist
92G Culinary Specialist
92L Petroleum Laboratory Specialist
92M Mortuary Affairs Specialist
92R Parachute Rigger
92S Shower/Laundry and Clothing Repair Specialist
92W Water Treatment Specialist
92Y Unit Supply Specialist
92Z Senior Noncommissioned Logistician

See also
Air Force Specialty Code
Badges of the United States Army
United States Army branch insignia
List of United States Coast Guard ratings
List of United States Marine Corps MOS
List of United States Navy ratings
List of United States Navy staff corps

References

AR 611-1 Military Occupational Classification Structure Development and Implementation (PDF)
Smartbook DA PAM 611-21
Field Manual 7-21.13, Appendix F: Arms and Services of the Army
MOS charts United States Army PAMXXI Personnel Authorizations Module

External links
PAMXXI (Personnel Authorizations Module) Website
PAMXXI (Personnel Authorizations Module) Website - MOS Charts
US Army MOS List 2013 (Unofficial) 
"Korean War Educator, Topics - Military Occupational Specialty (MOS)", Korean War Educator Foundation. Provides list of MOSs during the Korean War era.
Official Army career list 
"What Was my MOS?  Vietnam-era MOS Codes", 4th Battalion (Mechanized)/23rd Infantry Regiment "Tomahawks" Association Website. Provides list of MOSs during the Vietnam War era.

United States Army job titles
MOS
 List